is a railway station in the city of Sukagawa, Fukushima Prefecture, Japan, operated by East Japan Railway Company (JR East).

Overview
This station is a representative station of Sukagawa City, and is the closest station to the city center, Midorigaoka Park, Sukagawa Botan Garden and Yoshimine Fuji Garden.

Lines
Sukagawa Station is served by the Tōhoku Main Line, and is located 215.1 kilometers from the official starting point of the line at Tokyo Station.

Station layout
The station has two opposed side platforms. The station has a Midori no Madoguchi staffed ticket office.

Platforms

Operation from at this station
Upbound (for Yabuki, Shirakawa & Shin-Shirakawa)
During the day, one ordinary train (for Shin-Shirakawa) stops approximately every hour. Some trains also have Yabuki and Shirakawa lines. If you use the Kuroiso area from this station, you need to transfer at Shin-Shirakawa.
Downhill (for Kōriyama, Motomiya & Fukushima)
During the day, as in the case of climbing, one ordinary train (bound for Koriyama) stops approximately every hour. Some trains are also set up for Fukushima north of Koriyama and for Sendai.

History
Sukagawa Station opened on July 16, 1887. The station was absorbed into the JR East network upon the privatization of the Japanese National Railways (JNR) on April 1, 1987.

Passenger statistics
In fiscal 2018, the station was used by an average of 2,294 passengers daily (boarding passengers only).

Surrounding area
Sukagawa City Hall

Sukagawa Post Office
Abukuma River

See also
 List of railway stations in Japan

References

External links

  

Railway stations in Fukushima Prefecture
Tōhoku Main Line
Railway stations in Japan opened in 1887
Stations of East Japan Railway Company
Sukagawa, Fukushima